Der Pilger (The Pilgrim; known until 1960 as Der christliche Pilger, meaning The Christian Pilgrim) is the weekly newsletter of the Roman Catholic diocese of Speyer in Germany. It was founded on 1 January 1848, making it the oldest diocesan newspaper in Germany and older than the Osservatore Romano. The paper founded the "Die Aktion Silbermöve" fundraising campaign in 1960 and this produces around 1 million Euros annually.

The paper reports on church life in the diocese and international events in the Catholic Church, along with comment on news and political events from a Catholic perspective. It also includes religious texts such as prayers and interpretations of the week's scripture readings. The entertainment section offers book and theatre reviews, short stories, puzzles and recipes.

References

External links
 Homepage of Der Pilger
 Lecture by Professor Dr. Hans Joachim Meyer, 19 August 2008, on the paper's 160th anniversary (pdf file)

Catholic newspapers
Publications established in 1848
German-language newspapers
Weekly newspapers published in Germany
Speyer